Benita may refer to:
Benita (novel), a 1906 novel by H. Rider Haggard

Given name
Benita Haastrup (born 1964), Danish jazz drummer
Benita Sanders (born 1935), Canadian printmaker